Grevillea venusta, commonly known as the Byfield spider flower, is a woody shrub of the family Proteaceae native to a small region of central Queensland in eastern Australia. It has bright green leaves and unusually coloured green, gold and blackish inflorescences.

Taxonomy
It was described by Robert Brown in 1811 after he collected the type specimen near Cape Townsend in Queensland in August 1802. The specific epithet is derived from the Latin venustus "charming, lovely or graceful".

Description
They may be simple and 1–2 cm wide, or forked into two or more lobes. Each blooms is made up of 12-20 individual flowers, which are green at the base, with gold and then purple-black styles covered with short white hairs. The seedpods which follow are greenish and measure 1.6-1.9 x 0.8 cm.

Distribution and habitat
It is restricted to Central Queensland in the vicinity of Byfield National Park and Shoalwater Bay, and is classified as vulnerable by the Australian government. It grows on sandy soils on ridges and in dry eucalypt forests.

Cultivation
This has been cultivated since the early 1970s and is suitable for use in small gardens, where it grows readily in a sunny position with good drainage. It is frost hardy and tolerates humidity. It is a parent of two commonly seen cultivars, Grevillea 'Orange Marmalade', after being bred with Grevillea glossadenia, and of Grevillea 'Firesprite', after being bred with Grevillea longistyla.

References

External links

venusta
Flora of Queensland
Vulnerable flora of Australia
Nature Conservation Act vulnerable biota
Garden plants of Australia
Proteales of Australia
Plants described in 1810
Taxa named by Robert Brown (botanist, born 1773)